WOGM-LP is a low-powered FM radio station licensed to Jamestown, New York. The station broadcasts on 104.7 MHz and is licensed to, and operated by, the Lighthouse Baptist Church of Jamestown. As such, it carries a religious format from the Fundamental Broadcasting Network.

Prior to 2010, WOGM-LP had aired on 105.9 MHz. However, the establishment of WGWE (a full-power station in Little Valley whose signal covers the city of Jamestown) forced the station to go silent and find a new frequency.

External links
 
Official Web site of Lighthouse Baptist Church of Jamestown
Fundamental Broadcasting Network

OGM-LP